Crocus boryi  is a species of flowering plant in the genus Crocus of the family Iridaceae. It is a cormous perennial native to western and southern Greece to Kriti (Crete).

References

boryi